Cass is a 1978 Australian TV movie about a woman returning home.

References

External links

Cass at Oz Movies

Australian television films
1978 television films
1978 films
1970s English-language films